The 2011 Open GDF Suez de Marseille is a professional tennis tournament played on outdoor clay courts. It is part of the 2011 ITF Women's Circuit. It takes place in Marseille, France June 6–12, 2011.

WTA entrants

Seeds

Rankings are as of May 23, 2011.

Other entrants
The following players received wildcards into the singles main draw:
  Estelle Cascino
  Julie Coin
  Victoria Larrière
  Elixane Lechemia

The following players received entry from the qualifying draw:
  Dijana Banoveć
  Eva Fernández-Brugués
  Inés Ferrer-Suárez
  Tereza Mrdeža

The following players received entry by a lucky loser:
  Laura-Ioana Andrei

Champions

Singles

 Pauline Parmentier def.  Irina-Camelia Begu, 6–3, 6–2

Doubles

 Irina-Camelia Begu /  Nina Bratchikova def.  Laura-Ioana Andrei /  Mădălina Gojnea, 6–2, 6–2

References
Official website
ITF Search 

Open GDF Suez de Marseille
2011 in French tennis
Open Féminin de Marseille